Eoin Reilly (born 1990 in Abbeyleix, County Laois, Ireland) is an Irish sportsperson.  He plays hurling with his local club Abbeyleix and has been goalkeeper on the Laois senior inter-county team since 2010.

References

1990 births
Living people
Abbeyleix hurlers
Laois inter-county hurlers
Hurling goalkeepers